Igor Vladimirovich Trukhov (born 19 August 1976) is a Belarusian professional footballer coach and former player.

Career
Trukhov never suffered serious injuries throughout his playing career.

Honours
Belshina Bobruisk
Belarusian Premier League champion: 2001
Belarusian Cup winner: 2000–01

Naftan Novopolotsk
Belarusian Cup winner: 2008–09, 2011–12

References

External links

1976 births
Living people
Belarusian footballers
Association football midfielders
FC Lokomotiv Vitebsk (defunct) players
FC Vitebsk players
FC Belshina Bobruisk players
FC Torpedo-BelAZ Zhodino players
FC Naftan Novopolotsk players
FC Granit Mikashevichi players
FC Smolevichi players
Belarusian football managers
FC Smorgon managers
Sportspeople from Vitebsk